Pigment Yellow 12 is an organic compound and an azo compound.  It is a widely used yellow pigment.  It is also classified as a diarylide pigment, being derived from 3,3'-dichlorobenzidine.  It is closely related to Pigment Yellow 13, wherein the two phenyl groups are replaced by 2,4-xylyl.

References

Pigments
Organic pigments
Shades of yellow
Diarylide pigments